Horseshoe Lake is a reservoir that was formed by the Horseshoe Dam on the Verde River in the U.S. state of Arizona. The lake and dam are located inside the Tonto National Forest is located upstream and north of Bartlett Lake. The dam is managed by the Salt River Project.

References

Reservoirs in Maricopa County, Arizona
Reservoirs in Yavapai County, Arizona
Reservoirs in Arizona
Tonto National Forest